Ricardo Ramoran Visaya (born December 8, 1960) is a retired Philippine Army general serving as the administrator of the National Irrigation Administration (NIA) since 2017. He was the 47th Chief of Staff of the Armed Forces of the Philippines from July to December 2016. He had also previously served as the commanding general of the AFP Southern Luzon Command, assistant division commander of the 6th Infantry Division, and commander of the 4th Infantry Division. He is from the class of 1983 (Matikas) of the Philippine Military Academy.

On March 7, 2017, Visaya was appointed as National Irrigation Administration chief after Peter T. Laviña resign from his post a week prior.

Early life and education 
Ricardo Visaya was born in Bacarra, Ilocos Norte. It's also where he finished elementary and secondary education. He entered Philippine Military Academy in 1979 and graduated in 1983.

Military career 

After graduating in 1983, he led various units in the Philippine Army and the AFP, such as the 901st Infantry Battalion of the 9th Infantry Division, the 104th Infantry Brigade of the 1st Infantry Division and the 69th Infantry Brigade of the 6th Infantry Division.

He also led the 4th Infantry Division the 6th Infantry Division, and the AFP Southern Luzon Command, before being appointed as the Chief of Staff of the Armed Forces of the Philippines on July 1, 2016. He retired from military service on December 7, 2016.

Training
He attended various courses locally and abroad, such as the Scout Ranger Regular Course, the Intelligence Officer Basic Course, the Infantry Basic Course, the Infantry Officer Advance Course, the Tradecraft for Trainor's Course, the Electronic Warfare Officer Course, the Contract Management Course, the Executive Course on Security Studies in Hawaii, USA; the Command General Staff Course at the Training and Doctrine Command, Philippine Army; the Pacific Army Management Seminar in Tokyo , Japan ; the Professional Managers Program at the Ateneo de Manila University; and the Financial Statement Analysis program at the University of Asia and the Pacific. He earned his master's degree in Project Management at the  Australian Defence College in Canberra, Australia.

Awards
Visaya's awards include:
  Philippine Legion of Honor
  People Power I Unit Citation
  People Power II Unit Citation
  Philippine Republic Presidential Unit Citation
  Three (3) Gawad sa Kaunlaran
  Eleven (11) Bronze Cross Medals
  Forty Nine (49) Military Merit Medal (Philippines)
  Fourteen (14)  Military Commendation Medals
   Sagisag ng Ulirang Kawal
  Two (2) Silver Wing Medals
 20 Plaques of Recognitions
 PMA Cavalier Award (as outstanding alumnus of the Philippine Military Academy)
  Bronze Cross Medal
   Distinguished Service Star
   Gawad sa Kaunlaran
  Sagisag ng Ulirang Kawal
  Combat Commander's Badge (Philippines)
  Scout Ranger Qualification Badge
  Philippine Army Command and General Staff Course Badge

References 

1960 births
Chairmen of the Joint Chiefs (Philippines)
Duterte administration personnel
Filipino generals
Living people
People from Ilocos Norte
Philippine Army generals
Philippine Military Academy alumni
Recipients of Gawad sa Kaunlaran
Recipients of the Bronze Cross Medal
Recipients of the Distinguished Service Star
Recipients of the Military Commendation Medal
Recipients of the Military Merit Medal (Philippines)
Recipients of the Silver Wing Medal